United People's Party may refer to:

 United Peoples' Party (Bangladesh)
 Estonian United People's Party, later renamed the Constitution Party
 United Peoples Party (Fiji)
 United People's Party (Jamaica)
 United People's Party (Liberia)
 United People's Party (Malaysia) (disambiguation), several
 United People's Party (Poland)
 United People's Party (Saint Kitts and Nevis)
 United People's Party (Singapore)
 United People's Party (Sint Maarten)
 United People's Party (Zimbabwe)

See also 
 UPP (disambiguation)